The following highways are numbered 341:

Australia

Canada
Manitoba Provincial Road 341
 Newfoundland and Labrador Route 341
 Nova Scotia Route 341
Prince Edward Island Route 341
 Quebec Route 341

India
 National Highway 341

Japan
 Japan National Route 341

United States
  U.S. Route 341
  Arkansas Highway 341
  Connecticut Route 341
  Georgia State Route 341
  Indiana State Road 341
  Louisiana Highway 341
  Maryland Route 341
  Nevada State Route 341
 New York:
  New York State Route 341 (former)
 New York State Route 341 (former)
  County Route 341 (Erie County, New York)
  Pennsylvania Route 341
  Puerto Rico Highway 341
  Tennessee State Route 341
  Texas State Highway 341
  Virginia State Route 341
  Wisconsin Highway 341
  Wyoming Highway 341